Saint Mary's Abbey, Glencairn is a monastic community of nuns located in Glencairn, County Waterford, in Ireland. The community belongs to the Trappist branch of the Cistercian order, thus the nuns are also referred to as Trappistines. The original community of this monastic tradition had been welcomed to Ireland by St. Malachy in 1142. The monastery was founded in 1932 by nuns of Holy Cross Abbey—located at that time in Stapehill, Dorset, England—which itself had been founded in 1802 by a small group of refugee nuns from France, led by a nun who had been imprisoned in the Bastille during the French Revolution, and narrowly escaped being sent to the guillotine. The land for the St Marys Abbey, had been bought for them by the Cistercian Mount Melleray Abbey. The monks from Mount Melleray used to operate the farm.

This community was the first house of Cistercian nuns to be founded in Ireland since the Dissolution of the Monasteries by Henry VIII (1536–41). To date it remains the only Cistercian community of nuns in Ireland. It went on to found Mount Saint Mary's Abbey in Wrentham, Massachusetts, in 1949, the first community of Cistercian nuns in the United States; and St Justina's monastery, Abakaliki, Nigeria in 1982.

In 2014 the abbey featured in the RTE Would you Believe documentary School of Love.

The community consists of 29 nuns, who support themselves in standard Cistercian practice through the farming of their 200-acre farm, the baking of altar breads and providing greeting and spiritual cards for all occasions, both printed and handcrafted.

There is a graveyard at the abbey, where a number of nuns have been buried.

Superior / Abbess
In 2019 Sr. Marie Fahey was re-elected abbess, for her fourth six-year term.
 Sr Maura Mary Perry — Superior - 1932 – 31/01/1935 — Abbess — 31/01/1935 – 15/10/1935
 Sr Gertrude Purcell — Abbess — 05/11/1935 – 05/11/1944
 Sr Margaret Shaw — Abbess — 05/11/1944 – 05/11/1950
 Sr Gertrude Purcell (2) — Abbess — 05/11/1950 – 22/07/1955
 Sr Agnes Fahey — Sup. ad nutum — 22/07/1955 – 31/10/1958
 Sr Margaret Shaw (2) — Abbess — 31/10/1958 – 27/03/1965
 Sr Imelda Power — Abbess — 31/05/1965 – 31/05/1983
 Sr Dominic Lee — Abbess — 31/05/1983 – 31/05/1995
 Sr Agnes O’Shea — Abbess — 31/05/1995 – 31/05/2001
 Sr Marie Fahey OCSO - Abbess - 2001 - present

References

External links 
 
Trappistine monasteries
Christian organizations established in 1932
Religious buildings and structures in County Waterford
Christian monasteries in the Republic of Ireland